Andrew McGregor (1867 – unknown) was a Scottish footballer who played in the Football League for Notts County.

References

1867 births
Date of death unknown
Scottish footballers
English Football League players
Notts County F.C. players
Association football wingers
FA Cup Final players